Charters and Caldicott is a 1985 BBC mystery series featuring the characters Charters and Caldicott from the Hitchcock film The Lady Vanishes updated to a 1980s setting. It comprised six 50 minute episodes broadcast on BBC1 at 9.25pm on Thursdays from 10 January to 14 February 1985.

Plot
The story shows the pair in their retirement. Caldicott lives in the splendid Viceroy Court in Marylebone, whilst Charters is a widower living in a country cottage near Reigate, travelling up to his Pall Mall club on a Green Line bus (hailing it on the street as if it were a taxi).  When a young girl is found murdered in Caldicott's flat, Charters and Caldicott forsake their regular Friday lunch and cinema visit to involve themselves in solving the crime.  Inevitably, the plot involves the game of cricket, with the two finding coded messages in a letter that purports to correct errors in the description of a game in the Wisden Cricketers' Almanack, the official Bible of first-class cricket.

Cast
Robin Bailey – Charters
Michael Aldridge – Caldicott
Granville Saxton – Gregory
Caroline Blakiston – Margaret Mottram
Patrick Carter – Grimes
Tessa Peake-Jones – Jenny
Gerard Murphy – Inspector Snow

Crew
Keith Waterhouse – Writer
Julian Amyes – Director
Ron Craddock – Producer

External links

 Comedy Guide

BBC television comedy
1985 British television series debuts
1985 British television series endings